Orestes Rodríguez Williams (born 3 June 1989 in Guantánamo) is a Cuban runner. He competed in the 4 × 400 m relay event at the 2012 Summer Olympics. During a local meeting in La Habana he broke the world best for the unofficial distance of 500 metres by dipping under 1 minute for the first time officially in history by clocking 59.32.

References

External links
 

Sportspeople from Guantánamo
Cuban male sprinters
1989 births
Living people
Olympic athletes of Cuba
Athletes (track and field) at the 2012 Summer Olympics
21st-century Cuban people